The Centre Democrats (CD) were a Danish political party.

History
The party was formed in 1973 by Erhard Jakobsen, a former MP and mayor of Gladsaxe, as a centrist splinter group from the Danish Social Democrats. It participated in both centre-right governments (1982–1988) and centre-left governments (1993–1996).

In the 2001 election it lost its parliamentary representation, a severe setback for the party. In the 2005 election it got 33,635 votes (1% of votes nationwide). It also ran in several municipalities in the Danish municipal election in November 2005. It also ran in simultaneous elections to the new Regional Councils, except in Region Midtjylland where a local party official forgot to hand in the required number of voters' signatures before the deadline closed.

On 26 January 2008 an extraordinary party conference decided to dissolve the party by 1 February 2008.

Party leaders 

 1973–1989: Erhard Jakobsen
 1989–2005: Mimi Jakobsen
 2005–2007: Bjarne Møgelhøj
 2007–2008: Ben Haddou

Election results

Parliament (Folketing)

Municipal elections

Regional elections

European Parliament elections

Notes

References

External links 
centrumdemokraterne.dk - Official website (archived)

Defunct political parties in Denmark
Political parties established in 1973
Political parties disestablished in 2008
Centrist parties in Denmark
1973 establishments in Denmark
2008 disestablishments in Denmark